The Kansas City, Missouri City Council represents the population of more than 450,000 citizens. Its offices are on the 24th floor of Kansas City City Hall and its legislative chambers are on the 26th floor.

Kansas City, Missouri is the largest city in the state, divided into 6 districts, based on population. Each district is assigned one council member, who is elected every four years by the members of that district. Each district also gets one at-large member, who represents the district but is elected by the voters of the entire city. Based on this formula, there are 12 members total. However, the Mayor of Kansas City, Missouri, also elected by the voters of the city every 4 years, presides over all meetings and has a vote at meetings, making him a member of the council as well. The council also appoints a mayor pro tem to serve as mayor in the event the real mayor is unable to perform his duties.

Mayor: Quinton Lucas

1st District (The Eastern Northland and East Bottoms)
 Kevin O'Neill (At-large)
 Heather Hall

2nd District (The Western Northland)
 Teresa Loar (At-large)
 Dan Fowler

3rd District (The East Side)'
 Brandon Ellington (At-large)
 Melissa Robinson

4th District (SW Northland, Downtown, Midtown, The Northeast, Country Club District (including the Plaza), UMKC)
 Katheryn Shields (At-large)
 Eric Bunch

5th District (The Southeast Side)
 Lee Barnes Jr. (At-large)
 Ryana Parks-Shaw

6th District (South Kansas City)
 Andrea Bough (At-large)
 Kevin McManus (Mayor Pro Tem)

References

External links

Government of Kansas City, Missouri
Missouri city councils